The Vrbnik Statute is a 14th-century Glagolitic city statute of the Croatian city Vrbnik.

The Vrbnik Statute was written in 1388 on the east coast of the island of Krk in Croatia. The Vrbnik Statute is the second oldest among Croatian city statutes, written shortly after Vinodol Statute. It hasn't been preserved in Glagolitic Script like  the Veprinac Statute, but only as a transcript which was made by Vrbnik priest Grgur Zaskovic. Today, it is stored in the University Library of Zagreb.

The Vrbnik Statute confirms the status of Vrbnik, as an administrative and political centre from the 14th century.

See also

 List of Glagolitic manuscripts
 Kastav Statute

References

 Vrbnički statut 1380/1527

Medieval documents of Croatia
14th century in Croatia
1380s in law
Legal history of Croatia
Krk
Croatian glagolithic texts
1388 in Europe